Canobolas Shire was a local government area in the Central West region of New South Wales, Australia.

Canobolas Shire was proclaimed on 7 March 1906, one of 134 shires created after the passing of the Local Government (Shires) Act 1905. 

The shire offices were based in Orange. 

Urban areas in the shire included Lucknow and Spring Hill. 

The shire was amalgamated with Boree Shire, Molong Shire and part of Lyndhurst Shire to form Cabonne Shire on 1 October 1977.

References

Former local government areas of New South Wales
1906 establishments in Australia
1977 disestablishments in Australia